Saing Pen (born 6 July 1926) was a Cambodian equestrian. He competed in the individual jumping event at the 1956 Summer Olympics.

References

External links
 

1926 births
Possibly living people
Cambodian male equestrians
Olympic equestrians of Cambodia
Equestrians at the 1956 Summer Olympics
Place of birth missing (living people)